Pandeleteinus is a genus of broad-nosed weevils in the beetle family Curculionidae. There are about five described species in Pandeleteinus.

Species
These five species belong to the genus Pandeleteinus:
 Pandeleteinus elytroplanatus Howden, 1959 i c g
 Pandeleteinus lucidillus Howden, 1959 i c g b
 Pandeleteinus magdalenensis Howden, 1959 c g
 Pandeleteinus subcancer Howden, 1969 c g
 Pandeleteinus submetallicus (Schaeffer, 1908) i c g b
Data sources: i = ITIS, c = Catalogue of Life, g = GBIF, b = Bugguide.net

References

Further reading

 
 
 
 

Entiminae
Articles created by Qbugbot